The Association of United Ukrainian Canadians (AUUC) is a national cultural-educational non-profit organization established for Ukrainians in Canada.  With branches throughout Canada it sponsors such cultural activities as dance groups, orchestras, choirs and children's activities, and is involved in social justice and solidarity activities in partnership with other ethnocultural organizations, peace groups, and community organizations.

History

Establishment

The Ukrainian Labour Farmer Temple Association (ULFTA) was established in Winnipeg in 1918 as an association of cultural societies and community halls and the Ukrainian Social Democratic Party of Canada (USDPC). By 1928 it had 167 branches across Canada.  Labour Temples and other associated halls existed in cities like Winnipeg, Edmonton, and Toronto (1921), as well as in rural communities in the Ukrainian Block Settlements. 

As no form of public medicare was available at the time, ULFTA founded the Workers Benevolent Association (WBA) in Winnipeg in 1922, with branches and membership rapidly spreading throughout Canada; it even extended its membership to all workers, irrespective of ethnic origin.

In 1940, the ULFTA was banned under the wartime Defence of Canada Regulations, and a few of its leaders and journalists were interned. Several Labour Temples were confiscated by the federal government as "enemy property" with several being sold off.

Name change of 1940

In 1940, the ULFTA underwent a name change and became the Association of United Ukrainian Canadians (AUUC). 

Few post World War II immigrants joined the AUUC as most were opposed to the Soviet Union and Communism.

However, the AUUC has a legacy of senior's homes, children's camps, monuments and museums to Ukrainian literary giants, most notably the monument to the Ukrainian poet Lesya Ukrainka, a gift from Soviet Ukraine, on the grounds of the University of Saskatchewan in 1976. In addition, the AUUC still runs programs such as Edmonton's Trembita dance ensemble.

See also
 Ukrainian Labour Temple, Winnipeg
 United Jewish Peoples' Order
 Federation of Russian Canadians

Archives 
There is an Association of United Ukrainian Canadians fond at Library and Archives Canada. The archival reference number is R3120, former archival reference number is MG28-V154. The fond covers the date ranges 1929 to 1996. It includes 8 meters of textual records; 7 photographs; 3 film reels.

References

External links
 AUUC article at The Encyclopedia of Saskatchewan
 AUUC Edmonton Ukrainian Centre website
  AUUC Vancouver website

1918 establishments in Manitoba
Ethnic organizations based in Canada
Community centres in Canada
Ukrainian-Canadian culture
Labour history of Canada
Canada–Soviet Union relations
Communist Party of Canada mass organizations
Organizations established in 1918
Ukrainian cultural centres
Ukrainian diaspora organizations